The 2003 Zona Rosa attacks was a terrorist attack that occurred in Bogotá, Colombia on November 15, 2003. Grenades were thrown in two bars in the wealthy Zona Rosa neighborhood, killing one person, injuring 73 and badly damaging the premises.

The authorities blamed Revolutionary Armed Forces of Colombia (FARC) guerillas for the attack. The fatal victim was a young woman. Three Americans and a German were among the injured. It was believed the FARC targeted Americans in the attack. The U.S. government provided $2.5 billion to the Colombian government in its fight against rebels and drug traffickers. The attack was the sixth in Bogotá that year, and prompted security concerns to residents amid the rebels' increasing attacks in urban areas.

The national police managed to capture one of the men who threw the grenades.

References

2003 murders in Colombia
Attacks on tourists
Anti-Americanism
Car and truck bombings in Colombia
Crime in Bogotá
FARC actions
November 2003 events in South America
Terrorist incidents in South America in 2003
Terrorist incidents in Colombia in the 2000s